Kurtuluş is a village in Mut district of Mersin Province, Turkey. It is in the Toros Mountains. The population of Kurtuluş was 148 as of 2012. The major economic activity of the village is agriculture. Olive, apricot and figs are the main crops.

References

Villages in Mut District